The 1974 City National Buckeye Championships was a men's tennis tournament played on outdoor hard courts at the Buckeye Boys Ranch in Grove City, Columbus, Ohio in the United States that was part of Group B of the 1974 Grand Prix circuit. It was the fifth edition of the tournament and was held  from August 13 through August 19, 1974. Fourth-seeded Raúl Ramírez won his second consecutive singles title at the event and earned $9,000 first-prize money.

Finals

Singles
 Raúl Ramírez defeated  Roscoe Tanner 3–6, 7–6(7–3), 6–4
 It was Ramírez' 1st singles title of the year and 3rd of his career.

Doubles
 Anand Amritraj /  Vijay Amritraj defeated  Tom Gorman /  Bob Lutz walkover

References

Buckeye Tennis Championships
Buckeye Tennis Championships
Buckeye Tennis Championships
Buckeye Tennis Championships